Nikolai Prusakov (1900–1952) was a Russian poster and stage designer.

His work is kept in the Museum of Modern Art, the National Library of Russia, and the University of Michigan Museum of Art.

References

1900 births
1952 deaths
20th-century Russian artists
Russian graphic designers